Manto is a 2018 Indian biographical drama film based on the life of the prominent Urdu author Saadat Hasan Manto, written and directed by Nandita Das. The film stars Nawazuddin Siddiqui in the title character of Indo-Pakistani, author and writer Saadat Hasan Manto. Tahir Raj Bhasin plays the 1940s Hindi film superstar Shyam Chadda. Shyam was Manto's friend, confidant, and inspiration for a number of stories. Rasika Dugal plays the role of Manto's wife, Safia. Manto is based on the 1940s post-Independence period of India. Manto earned seven nominations at 64th Filmfare Awards including Best Film Critics, Best Actor Critics for Siddiqui.

The poster of the film was unveiled at the 2017 Cannes Film Festival. Das made a short film titled In Defence of Freedom, also starring Nawazuddin in the main role, and was released on YouTube on 23 March 2017. The film premiered at the 2018 Cannes Film Festival and released in Indian theatres on 21 September 2018. It was made as a prelude to the feature film. The film has multiple producers such as HP Studios, Filmstoc, and Viacom 18 Motion Pictures.

Plot
Bombay, 1946: Amidst the freedom struggle against the British Empire and the forewarning of India being partitioned, Saadat Hasan Manto, a well-established short story writer works in the glittering world of the Bombay film industry as a scriptwriter. Although Manto has a tenuous relationship with the Progressive Writers’ Association, many of its members are his close friends, including the feminist writer, Ismat Chughtai. They are both acquitted from the charge of obscenity for their respective works. Manto has many admirers and friends in the film industry. The closest is Shyam Chadda, a charming budding actor and Ashok Kumar, a famous actor, director and producer. But, his biggest supporter and the unwavering pillar of strength is his wife, Safia.
  
Soon after, India gains independence on 15 August 1947 and the new nation of Pakistan is born. Safia leaves for Lahore to attend her sister's wedding. Despite flaring Hindu-Muslim tensions, Manto decides to stay back in his beloved city of Bombay. One day, Shyam, on hearing that his family was forced to flee Pakistan because of a Muslim mob attack, tells Manto in anger: "I could have even killed you." Shocked and anguished, a non-practicing Muslim, Manto suddenly becomes conscious of his religious identity and the vulnerabilities that come with it. He impulsively makes the unimaginable decision of moving to Pakistan.
 
Lahore, 1948: A melancholic city full of refugees, forsaken property, and burnt buildings becomes Manto's new home. He is left grappling with a growing sense of isolation and a deep sense of betrayal. As he struggles to come to terms with his new reality, he spirals into a state of perpetual drunkenness. Though Safia continues to stand by him, their marriage begins to feel the strain. Relentless and long-drawn court trials alleging obscenity in his story Thanda Gosht (literal meaning: Cold Meat) take a severe toll on his health and finances. His statement in defense of literature and free speech is met with conviction. Despite this, he continues to pen some of his sharpest and most courageous works.

His compulsions to write and drink are in direct conflict with his desire to see his family - his wife and two daughters, happy and secure. His failing health makes him hallucinate. Unable to see his family suffer any longer, he finally admits himself into the alcohol rehabilitation center at Lahore Mental Hospital.

The main narrative is seamlessly interspersed with five of his poignant stories. The last one being his most famous story - Toba Tek Singh. Manto begins the story with, "two or three years after Partition, it occurred to the governments of India and Pakistan to exchange their lunatics like they had exchanged their criminals. The Muslim lunatics in India were to be sent to Pakistan and the Hindu lunatics in Pakistani asylums were to be handed over to India." The Sikh protagonist, who has vowed to remain standing until he finds his village, lies in death in no-man's land, between the two nations. Manto's predicament is not too different.

Cast

 Nawazuddin Siddiqui as Saadat Hasan Manto
 Rasika Dugal as Safia
 Tahir Raj Bhasin  as Shyam
 Feryna Wazheir  as Nargis
 Javed Akhtar as Abid Ali Abid
 Chandan Roy Sanyal as Ahmed Nadeem Qasmi
 Vinod Nagpal as Bishan Singh
 Rishi Kapoor as Film Producer
 Inaamulhaq as Hamid
 Ranvir Shorey as Ishar Singh
 Rajshri Deshpande as Ismat Chugtai
 Ila Arun as Jaddanbai
 Divya Dutta as Kulwant Kaur
 Paresh Rawal as Pimp
 Tillotama Shome as Prostitute
 Vijay Varma
 Saharsh Kumar Shukla
 Shashank Arora as Shaad Amritsari
 Gurdas Maan as Sirajuddin
 Danish Husain as Asad Zaidi
 Bhanu Uday as Ashok Kumar
 Madhurjeet Sarghi as Nasira Iqbal

Production

Background
Saadat Hasan Manto's (1912-1955) short stories set during the devastating partition of the Indian subcontinent were his defining works. These irreverent, unflinching but deeply humane stories, earned him the wrath of the British Indian government and later of Pakistan. The stories were deemed obscene by the courts and he spent his last years fighting legal battles to defend his right to write. Today, his work is seen by both scholars and the reading public as one of the most authentic and independent accounts of the human tragedy of those years.

Casting
In November 2015, it was reported that Nandita Das had approached actor Irrfan Khan to play the leading role in her film Manto. Nandita said that, "Irrfan fits the role to the T as he speaks fluent Urdu, looks a lot like Manto and, above all, is a wonderful actor. He has read a lot of Manto himself and is influenced by him." In May 2016, during the 69th Cannes Film Festival Nandita announced that Nawazuddin Siddiqui had been finalized for the central role of Manto in her next film. Nandita said that, "I have had Nawazuddin in mind from the very outset, but in India, economics always interferes with art and there was pressure on me to cast a more mainstream star."

Filming

The film was shot on various locations across Mumbai and the lahore portions were shot in the village called Vaso (Nadiad) in Gujarat. The shooting continued for 41 days before reaching its endpoint in July 2017.

Release

It was selected to compete in the Un Certain Regard section at the 2018 Cannes Film Festival. The official teaser of the film was released on 12 May 2018. The trailer of film was released on 14 August 2018.

Soundtrack 

The music of the film is composed by Sneha Khanwalkar and Raftaar while the lyrics have been penned by Dibakar Banerjee, Simaab Akbarabadi, Meeraji, Faiz Ahmed Faiz, Raftaar and Saadat Hasan Manto. The first song of the film titled as "Nagri Nagri" sung by Shankar Mahadevan was released 31 August 2018. The album released by Zee Music Company on 9 September 2018.

Nandita Das had asked Khanwalkar not to use any electronic music. Moreover, the composer was asked to compose songs from poems of 1940s and 50s. Three poems were chosen for this. The song "Ban Titli" was made by the composer for a Dibakar Banerjee-project which was cancelled.

Vipin Nair of The Hindu gave the soundtrack 4/5, calling it a "whopper" soundtrack and wishing it was longer.

Reception

Accolades

See also
 Manto (2015 film), Pakistani biographical film on the writer
 List of Bollywood films of 2018

References

External links 
 
 
 Manto at Bollywood Hungama
 

2010s Hindi-language films
2018 films
Films scored by Sneha Khanwalkar
Films scored by Raftaar
Indian films based on actual events
Indian biographical drama films
Saadat Hasan Manto
Viacom18 Studios films
Films about writers
Films set in the partition of India
Drama films based on actual events
2010s Urdu-language films
Films set in the 1940s
Films about Bollywood
Films set in Lahore
2018 biographical drama films
2018 drama films
Films set in Mumbai
Films shot in Mumbai
Faiz Ahmad Faiz